Augusto Cezar Alves Sampaio is a Brazilian computer scientist who works with formal methods and language semantics.

Augusto Sampaio from Recife, Pernambuco, Brazil. He graduated from the Centro de Informática (CIn) at the Federal University of Pernambuco (UFPE) (with a BSc degree in 1985 and MSc degree in 1988). He undertook his PhD studies under the supervision of Prof. Sir Tony Hoare at the Oxford University Computing Laboratory (finishing in 1993). In 2013 Sampaio became Commander of the Scientific Merit Order, awarded by the Brazilian Science and Technology Ministry. In July 2016 Sampaio received the title of Doctor Honoris Causa from the University of York, UK.

Sampaio is a professor at the Federal University of Pernambuco. His main contributions are in the area of model transformations and automatic generation of test from formal models.

References

External links
 
 
 

Year of birth missing (living people)
Living people
People from Recife
Federal University of Pernambuco alumni
Alumni of the University of Oxford
Brazilian computer scientists
Formal methods people
Members of the Department of Computer Science, University of Oxford
Academic staff of the Federal University of Pernambuco